Tiscali may refer to:

 Tiscali, an Italian telecommunications company
 Tiscali Italia, an Italian telecommunications company
 Tiscali UK, a British telecommunications company
 Tiscali Short Film Award, sponsored by the company
 Tiscali (village), an archaeological site in Sardinia, Italy

See also 
 Tiscali TV